A state of the Confederate States of America was one of the constituent entities that the Confederacy recognized as sharing their sovereignty with the Confederate government. Confederates were citizens of both the confederal republic and of the state in which they resided, due to the shared sovereignty between each state and the Confederate government. Virginia  was admitted into the Confederacy as a commonwealth rather than a state.  The Confederacy recognized 13 states, but Kentucky and Missouri were border states represented by governments-in-exile; their pre-war state legislatures never voted to secede, but the Confederacy recognized pro-South provisional governments there as legitimate.

States were the primary subdivisions of the Confederate States and possessed a number of powers and rights under the Constitution of the Confederate States, such as regulating intrastate commerce, running elections, creating local governments, and ratifying constitutional amendments. Each state had its own constitution grounded in republican principles, and government consisting of executive, legislative, and judicial branches.

All states and their residents were represented in the Confederate States Congress, a bicameral legislature consisting of the Senate and the House of Representatives. Each state was represented by two senators, while Representatives were distributed among the states in proportion to the most recent constitutionally mandated decennial census. Additionally, each state was entitled to select a number of electors to vote in the Electoral College, the body that elected the President of the Confederate States, equal to the total of Representatives and Senators in Congress from that state.

Every new state was admitted pursuant to Article I, Section 6 of the Confederacy's Provisional Constitution which required a simple majority vote in the Provisional Congress.  Since the establishment of the Confederate States in 1861, the number of states expanded from the original seven to 13. Each new state had been admitted on an equal footing with the existing states.  Under Article IV, Section 3, Clause 1 of the permanent Constitution Congress had the authority to admit additional states into the Confederacy, but unlike the United States and Provisional Confederate Constitutions which required a simple majority vote admission of new states to the Confederacy required a two-thirds vote in each House with the senators from each state voting jointly.

The following table is a list of all 13 states and their respective dates of statehood. The first seven became states in February and March 1861 upon agreeing to the Provisional Constitution of the Confederate States, and each joined the permanent Confederation of states between March 12 and April 22, 1861, upon ratifying the Constitution of the Confederate States, its permanent constitution (a separate table is included below showing Provisional Constitution of the Confederate States adoption dates). These seven states are presented in the order in which each ratified the permanent Constitution, thus joining the permanent government. The date of admission listed for Virginia, Arkansas, North Carolina, Tennessee, Missouri, and Kentucky was the official date set by an act of the Provisional Congress of the Confederate States.

List of Confederate states

Provisional Constitution of the Confederate States adoption dates
A provisional congress made up of six Southern states meeting at the Alabama State Capitol in Montgomery, Alabama, approved the Provisional Constitution of the Confederate States on February 8, 1861. On February 18, 1862, the temporary government under the Provisional Constitution of the Confederate States was replaced with a permanent federal government under the Confederate States Constitution.

References

Date Of Admission To The Confederacy
Confederate States of America geography-related lists
Confederate States of America history timelines
Confederate States of America history-related lists